Motul Municipality (in the Yucatec Maya language: 'place of no overflowing') is one of the 106 municipalities in the Mexican state of Yucatán.

History
The founder of Motul was a Maya priest named Zac Mutul. An exact date is unknown, but the city dates from the eleventh century. Before the conquest, it was part of the province of Ceh Pech and afterwards, became part of the encomienda system. In 1581, the encomendero was Francisco de Bracamonte.

In 1821, Yucatán was declared independent of the Spanish Crown. In 1825 the area was part of the Coastal region, with its headquarters in Izamal.

During the Caste War of Yucatán in 1847, the state government ordered that suspects who appeared to be part of the conspiracy to revolt against the white settlers be whipped. Some 200 Indians were punished and the headman of Motul, Baselio May along with two of his fellow leaders José Miguel Pech and Nicolás Kuk were beaten and condemned to die, though their participation in the revolt was dubious.

On 10 March 1852 the town was elevated to the category of Villa and made head of the municipality and on 22 February 1872, it was decreed a city.

From 29 to 31 March 31, 1918, the first Socialist Congress convened in Motul to examine worker's issues. That same year, on 8 July, the Kopté Rancho, which was part of the municipality, was elevated to the status of a town. On 30 September 1924, the name of the recently assassinated governor Felipe Carrillo Puerto was appended to the name of the city, but was later repealed. On 2 October 1933, it was appended again and the official name of the head of the municipality became Motul de Carrillo Puerto.

Governance
The municipal president is elected for a term of three years. The president appoints nine Councilpersons to serve on the board for three year terms, as the Secretary and councilors of sports, special events, public works, commissaries, public services, nomenclature, cemeteries, ecology, public lighting.

The Municipal Council administers the business of the municipality. It is responsible for budgeting and expenditures and producing all required reports for all branches of the municipal administration. Annually it determines educational standards for schools.

The Police Commissioners ensure public order and safety. They are tasked with enforcing regulations, distributing materials and administering rulings of general compliance issued by the council.

Communities
The main town in the municipality is the eponymous Motul, Yucatán. Within its municipal jurisdiction are eight locations considered important communities. There are also a large number of smaller communities with minimal population, which include: Acabah, Cenotillo, Dzununkán, Kambul, Kancahal, Kancabchén, Rancho Kankanchá, Komchén Martinez, Kopté, Hacienda Marco, Panabá, Rogelio Chalé, Sabacnah, Sakolá, San Antonio Dzinah, San Pedro Cámara, San Pedro Chacabal, San Rafael, San Antonio, San Roque, Santa Cruz Pachón, Santa Teresa, Tunyá, Telal, Texán Espejo, Ticopo Gutiérrez, and Uitzil. The eight major population areas are shown below:

Local festivals
Every year from 8 to 16 July, Motul holds a fiesta in honor of Our Lady of Carmen.

Tourist attractions
 San Juan Bautista Church
 the house where Felipe Carrillo Puerto was born
 Hacienda Dzitox
Hacienda Kancabchén Ucí
 Hacienda Santa Teresa
 Hacienda Ukanhá
 Hacienda Xinteilá

Notables
Felipe Carrillo Puerto
Elvia Carrillo Puerto

References

External links

 Cenote Sambula

Municipalities of Yucatán